The cutlassfishes are about 45 species of predatory fish in the family Trichiuridae of the order Scombriformes found in seas throughout the world. Fish of this family are long, slender, and generally steely blue or silver in colour, giving rise to their name. They have reduced or absent pelvic and caudal fins, giving them an eel-like appearance, and large fang-like teeth.

Some of the species are known as scabbardfishes or hairtails; others are called frostfishes because they appear in late autumn and early winter, around the time of the first frosts.

Classification
This list of species follows FishBase:

 Subfamily Aphanopidinae Gill, 1863
 Genus Aphanopus
 Aphanopus arigato Parin, 1994
 Aphanopus beckeri Parin, 1994
 Aphanopus capricornis Parin, 1994
 Aphanopus carbo Lowe, 1839 (Black scabbardfish)
 Aphanopus intermedius Parin, 1983 (Intermediate scabbardfish)
 Aphanopus microphthalmus Norman, 1939 (Smalleye scabbardfish)
 Aphanopus mikhailini Parin, 1983 (Mikhailin's scabbardfish)
 Genus Benthodesmus Goode & Bean, 1882
 Benthodesmus elongatus, Clarke, 1879 (Elongate frostfish)
 Benthodesmus macrophthalmus, Parin & Becker, 1970 (Bigeye frostfish)
 Benthodesmus neglectus,  Parin, 1976 (Neglected frostfish)
 Benthodesmus oligoradiatus, Parin & Becker, 1970 (Sparse-rayed frostfish)
 Benthodesmus pacificus, Parin & Becker, 1970 (North Pacific frostfish)
 Benthodesmus papua, Parin, 1978 (Papuan frostfish)
 Benthodesmus simonyi, Steindachner, 1891 (Simony's frostfish)
 Benthodesmus suluensis, Parin, 1976 (Philippine frostfish)
 Benthodesmus tenuis, Günther, 1877 (Slender frostfish)
 Benthodesmus tuckeri, Parin & Becker, 1970 (Tucker's frostfish)
 Benthodesmus vityazi, Parin & Becker, 1970 (Vityaz' frostfish)
 Subfamily Lepidopodinae, Gill, 1863 
 Genus Assurger
 Assurger anzac Alexander, 1917 (Razorback scabbardfish)
 Genus Eupleurogrammus
 Eupleurogrammus glossodon, (Bleeker, 1860) (Longtooth hairtail)
 Eupleurogrammus muticus, (Gray, 1831) (Smallhead hairtail)
 Genus Evoxymetopon
 Evoxymetopon macrophthalmus Chakraborty, Yoshino & Iwatsuki, 2006
 Evoxymetopon moricheni Fricke, Golani & Appelbaum-Golani, 2014
 Evoxymetopon poeyi Günther, 1887 (Poey's scabbardfish)
 Evoxymetopon taeniatus Gill, 1863 (Channel scabbardfish)
 Genus Lepidopus
 Lepidopus altifrons, Parin & Collette, 1993 (Crested scabbardfish)
 Lepidopus calcar, Parin & Mikhailin, 1982 (Hawaiian ridge scabbardfish)
 Lepidopus caudatus, (Euphrasen, 1788) (Silver scabbardfish)
 Lepidopus dubius, Parin & Mikhailin, 1981 (Doubtful scabbardfish)
 Lepidopus fitchi , Rosenblatt & Wilson, 1987 (Fitch's scabbardfish)
 Lepidopus manis, Rosenblatt & Wilson, 1987 (Ghost scabbardfish)
Subfamily Trichiurinae Rafinesque, 1810
 Genus Demissolinea
 Demissolinea novaeguineensis, Burhanuddin & Iwatsuki, 2003 (New Guinean hairtail)
 Genus Lepturacanthus
 Lepturacanthus pantului, (Gupta, 1966) (Coromandel hairtail)
 Lepturacanthus roelandti  (Bleeker, 1860) 
 Lepturacanthus savala, (Cuvier, 1829) (Savalani hairtail)
 Genus Tentoriceps
 Tentoriceps cristatus, (Klunzinger, 1884) (Crested hairtail)
 Genus Trichiurus
 Trichiurus auriga, Klunzinger, 1884 (Pearly hairtail)
 Trichiurus australis Chakraborty, Burhanuddin & Iwatsuki, 2005
 Trichiurus brevis, Wang & You, 1992 (Chinese short-tailed hairtail)
 Trichiurus gangeticus, Gupta, 1966 (Ganges hairtail)
 Trichiurus lepturus, Linnaeus, 1758 (Largehead hairtail)
 Trichiurus margarites, Li, 1992
 Trichiurus nanhaiensis, Wang & Xu, 1992
 Trichiurus nickolensis, Burhanuddin & Iwatsuki, 2003 (Australian short-tailed hairtail)
 Trichiurus russelli, Dutt & Thankam, 1966 (Short-tailed hairtail)

Timeline of genera

References

External links
 Listing of Trichiuridae in English and Japanese 2003-10-27

 
Taxa named by Constantine Samuel Rafinesque